Sarni may refer to:
 Sarni, India, a municipality in Madhya Pradesh
 Bill Sarni (1927–1983), a Major League Baseball catcher
 Stéphane Sarni (born 1980), a Swiss-Italian footballer

See also
 Sarni Dół, a settlement in the Warmian-Masurian Voivodeship in northern Poland
 Sarni Dwór-Leśniczówka,  a settlement in the Pomeranian Voivodeship in northern Poland